Meers Oppenheim (born 1962, Bethesda, Maryland) is a Professor of Astronomy at Boston University. His primary research interests include computational and theoretical space plasma physics, dynamics of the ionosphere and solar atmosphere, particle-wave interactions in plasmas, and the physics of meteor trails.

Education
Oppenheim received his B.S. and M.Eng. in 1984 and 1990 from Cornell University's School of Applied and Engineering Physics. He then received his Ph.D. of Electrical Engineering in 1995 from Cornell's Space Plasma Physics Group.

Career
Oppenheim began his career as a programmer and junior analyst at Jack Faucett Associates, Inc. in Chevy Chase, Maryland from 1980 to 1982. From 1984 to 1986, he worked as a staff physicist at the Physics International Corporation in San Leandro, California.

In 1988, Oppenheim was a research assistant at Cornell University. In 1995, he became a Max Planck Society Postdoctoral Scientist. In 1996, he became a research associate at the University of Colorado, Boulder.

In 1998, Oppenheim began working as an assistant professor of astronomy at Boston University. He became an associate professor in 2004, and in 2013, a full professor. In 2018, he became the director of graduate admissions at Boston University.

Scientific contributions
Oppenheim studies space plasma physics using supercomputer simulations, theory, and data. He works on a range of research topics, including ionospheric and solar collisional plasmas, particle-wave interactions, and the physics of meteor trails. Since 2016, he has been working to incorporate the important effects of ionospheric turbulence into planetary scale simulations of the coupled magnetosphere, ionosphere and atmosphere. He has also been trying to model wave heating of the solar chromosphere. Most recently, he has also been working on understanding the effects of UV photoelectrons on the ionosphere and their observational consequences.

Honors and awards
 1988–1989: Reily scholar
 1994: CEDAR conference honorable mention
 1994: Spring AGU meeting outstanding student paper
 1995–1996: Max Planck Society Fellowship
 1996: National Research Council Fellowship
 2001: Elected member, Union Radio Science International
 2002–2005: Elected Vice-Chair, Union Radio Science International
 2003–2005: Member, American Physical Science, Division of Plasma Physics, program committee
 2006–present: Elected Chair, Union Radio Science International, U.S.A Commission H
 2008–2011: Elected member, CEDAR Science Steering Committee
 2011–2014: Elected Vice-Chair, Union Radio Science International, International Commission H
 2016: CEDAR Prize Lecturer
 2018: Visiting Scholar and Professor, Leibniz-Institut f ̈ur Atmosph ̈arenphysik, Kuhlungsborn, Germany
 Member of the American Geophysical Union
 Member of the American Physical Society
 Member of the American Association for the Advancement of Science

Selected publications

References 

American physicists
Fellows of the American Geophysical Union
Boston University
Boston University faculty
Living people
1962 births